Ameles arabica is a species of praying mantis that inhabits Saudi Arabia.

References

arabica
Mantodea of Asia
Insects of the Middle East
Insects described in 1939
Taxa named by Boris Uvarov